Phenylobacterium composti is a Gram negative, strictly aerobic and motile bacterium from the genus of Phenylobacterium which has been isolated from cotton waste compost from Suwon in Korea.

References

Caulobacterales
Bacteria described in 2008